Churchward is a surname. Notable people with the surname include:

George Jackson Churchward (1857–1933), chief mechanical engineer of the Great Western Railway
Hedley Churchward (1862–1929), British painter
James Churchward (1851–1936), British tea planter, Inventor and later, an author
Joseph Churchward (1932–2013), Samoan New Zealander graphic designer and typesetter